Kauppakatu (lit. "market street") is a street in the center of Kuopio in North Savonia, Finland. The length of the street is about 1,500 meters. The street starts from Makasiinikatu from Kuopio Harbor and ends at Sairaalakatu. The street runs along the southern edge of Kuopio Market Square. Kauppakatu intersects with 19 streets and has ten traffic light-controlled intersections along it.

After the completion of the underground project, Kauppakatu will become a pedestrian street at the market square, between Vuorikatu and Ajurinkatu.

Most of the restaurants in the center of Kuopio are also located along Kauppakatu or in its immediate vicinity.

See also 
 Kuopio Market Hall
 Kuopio Market Square
 List of shopping streets and districts by city

Sources 
 Meijerin nurkalla.  Kauppakadun lapset kertovat. Toimittaneet: Maija Metsämäki, Aila Huttunen ja Mikko Metsämäki. . (in Finnish)

References

External links 

Streets in Kuopio